Madonna Creek is a  stream in San Mateo County, California, USA, which is a tributary of Pilarcitos Creek.

See also
List of watercourses in the San Francisco Bay Area

References

Rivers of San Mateo County, California
Rivers of Northern California